Mohammad or Muhammad Hussain may refer to:

 Mohammad Hussain (cricketer), former Pakistani Test cricketer
 Muhammad Hussain (islamist), American Islamist terrorist
 Mohammad Majid Hussain, Indian politician
 Mohammad Hussein Fadlallah (1935–2010), a Lebanese Twelver Shia Muslim Grand Ayatollah
 Muhammad Hussain (soldier) (1949–1971), Pakistani soldier awarded the Nishan-e-Haider
 Muhammad Hussain Najafi (born 1932), Pakistani Twelver Shia Muslim, a Grand Ayatollah
 Mohammad Hussain Sarahang, Afghan musician
 Mohammad Hussain Talat, Pakistani first-class cricketer

See also 
 Muhammad Husain (born 1951), Malaysian politician